Fernando Pacheco (born 1992) is a Spanish footballer.

Fernando Pacheco may also refer to:

 Fernando Pacheco Filho (born 1983), Brazilian former handball player
 Fernando Pacheco (footballer, born 1999), Peruvian footballer